Macronychus is a genus of riffle beetles in the family Elmidae. There are about 11 described species in Macronychus.

Species
These 11 species belong to the genus Macronychus:
 Macronychus glabratus Say, 1825
 Macronychus indicus Hinton, 1940
 Macronychus jaechi Ciampor & Kodada, 1998
 Macronychus jendeki Ciampor & Kodada, 1998
 Macronychus kubani Ciampor & Kodada, 1998
 Macronychus levanidovae Lafer, 1980
 Macronychus quadrituberculatus Müller, 1806
 Macronychus reticulatus Ciampor & Kodada, 1998
 Macronychus sulcatus Ciampor & Kodada, 1998
 Macronychus ultimus Ciampor & Kodada, 1998
 Macronychus vietnamensis Delève, 1968

References

Further reading

External links

 

Elmidae
Articles created by Qbugbot